Richard Baxter (born 23 June 1978) is a retired Rugby union player who played his entire professional career for his local club, Exeter Chiefs in the RFU Championship and Aviva Premiership. He made his first team debut for Exeter Chiefs against Fylde on 11 October 1997. His position of choice is Number 8.

He announced his retirement on 2 May 2013 after playing 16 seasons, 431 games and 126 tries for Exeter.

Richard is the younger brother of Chiefs coach Rob Baxter.

References

External links
 Exeter Profile

1978 births
Living people
English rugby union players
Exeter Chiefs players
Rugby union number eights
Rugby union players from Exeter